The 1998 Goody's Headache Powder 500 was the eighth stock car race of the 1998 NASCAR Winston Cup Series season and the 49th iteration of the event. The race was originally scheduled to be held on Sunday, April 19, 1998, but was postponed to Monday, April 20, due to rain. The race was held in Martinsville, Virginia at Martinsville Speedway, a  permanent oval-shaped short track. The race took the scheduled 500 laps to complete. At race's end, Morgan–McClure Motorsports driver Bobby Hamilton would manage to dominate not only the race, but most of the race weekend to take his third career NASCAR Winston Cup Series victory and his only victory of the season. The win also marked the final Winston Cup victory for Morgan–McClure Motorsports. To fill out the podium, Roush Racing driver Ted Musgrave and Robert Yates Racing driver Dale Jarrett would finish second and third, respectively.

Background 

Martinsville Speedway is an NASCAR-owned stock car racing track located in Henry County, in Ridgeway, Virginia, just to the south of Martinsville. At 0.526 miles (0.847 km) in length, it is the shortest track in the NASCAR Cup Series. The track was also one of the first paved oval tracks in NASCAR, being built in 1947 by H. Clay Earles. It is also the only remaining race track that has been on the NASCAR circuit from its beginning in 1948.

Entry list 

 (R) denotes rookie driver.

Practice

First practice 
The first practice session was held on the morning of Friday, April 17.

Second practice 
The second practice session was held on the morning of Saturday, April 18.

Final practice 
The final practice session, sometimes referred to as Happy Hour, was held on the afternoon of Saturday, April 18.

Qualifying 
Qualifying was split into two rounds. The first round was held on Friday, April 17, at 3:00 PM EST. Each driver would have one lap to set a time. During the first round, the top 25 drivers in the round would be guaranteed a starting spot in the race. If a driver was not able to guarantee a spot in the first round, they had the option to scrub their time from the first round and try and run a faster lap time in a second round qualifying run, held on Saturday, April 18, at 1:15 PM EST. As with the first round, each driver would have one lap to set a time. On January 24, 1998, NASCAR would announce that the amount of provisionals given would be increased from last season. Positions 26-36 would be decided on time, while positions 37-43 would be based on provisionals. Six spots are awarded by the use of provisionals based on owner's points. The seventh is awarded to a past champion who has not otherwise qualified for the race. If no past champion needs the provisional, the next team in the owner points will be awarded a provisional.

Three drivers would fail to qualify: Wally Dallenbach Jr., Dave Marcis, and Gary Bradberry.

Full qualifying results 

*Time not available.

Race results

References 

1998 NASCAR Winston Cup Series
NASCAR races at Martinsville Speedway
April 1998 sports events in the United States
1998 in sports in Virginia